Penguin Town is a 2021 Netflix Original documentary television series narrated by Patton Oswalt. It follows a group of endangered penguins in Simon's Town, South Africa as they search for mates, raise their young and interact with other penguins. The series was released on June 16, 2021.

Episodes

Production 

Penguin Town was produced by Red Rock Films.

Penguin Town is set on Boulders Beach in Simon's Town, a suburb of Cape Town on the Western Cape of South Africa.

The British Board of Film Classification issued a 'Parental Guidance' certificate.

Broadcast 
Penguin Town was released on Netflix on 16 June 2021.

Reception 
Writing for the Chicago Sun-Times, Richard Roeper described the series as a "featherweight documentary", praising Oswalt's narration. In his review for The Guardian, Stuart Heritage called the series "tremendous comfort food", praising the lack of violence. The New Statesman India Bourke criticised the series for "lightly mocking an endangered species" for entertainment.

References

External links 

 

 
 

2020s documentary television series
Netflix original documentary television series
2020s South African television series
Television series about penguins
English-language Netflix original programming